The following public artworks are or were installed in Olympia, Washington:

 Arc of Statehood
 Boiler Works
 Du Pen Fountain
 The Kiss
 Korean War Memorial
 Law Enforcement Memorial
 Mysteries of Life
 Sea to Sky
 The Shaman
 Territorial Sundial
 Tivoli Fountain
 The Twelve Labors of Hercules (relocated to Centralia)
 Untitled (1973), Lee Kelly
 Water Garden
 Winged Victory
 Woman Dancing
 World War II Memorial

Culture of Olympia, Washington
 
Olympia
Olympia